Fellsburg is an unincorporated community in Edwards County, Kansas, United States.

History
A post office was opened in Fellsburg in 1880, and remained in operation until it was discontinued in 1984.

References

Further reading

External links
 Edwards County maps: Current, Historic, KDOT

Unincorporated communities in Edwards County, Kansas
Unincorporated communities in Kansas